The 2015 Heroes of the Storm World Championship was first annual world championship for Heroes of the Storm, and was held at BlizzCon from October 28 to November 7, 2015. Cloud9 won the tournament with a roster of DunkTrain, Fan, iDream, k1pro, and KingCaffeine. There was a total of US$1.2 million given out as prize money.

Final standings

References

Heroes of the Storm, 2015
2015 in esports
Heroes of the Storm
2015 in Los Angeles
2015 in sports in California
Blizzard Entertainment competitions